Derek and Simon: The Show is a 2007 web based series created by Derek Waters, Simon Helberg, and Bob Odenkirk, which aired on the website Super Deluxe. It went through several iterations and names, starting in 2005, before the 13 episode series came to fruition.

History
Derek Waters, Simon Helberg, and Bob Odenkirk first created Derek and Simon in 2005; after meeting with Waters and Helberg, Odenkirk suggested they capitalize on stories from their own lives. The project went through several different stages.  First it was a pilot presentation.  Then it was developed into two 15-minute segments, "Derek & Simon: A Bee and a Cigarette" and "Derek & Simon: The Pity Card", together in a half-hour pilot for HBO as The Derek & Simon Show.  When it did not air, the two segments were sent to film festivals, including the Sundance Film Festival and South by Southwest Film Festival, as well as being part of Timothy McSweeney's Wholphin DVD Magazine.  Matt Tobey of Comedy Central Insider called The Pity Card "hilariously irreverent". The series Derek and Simon: The Show was then developed in 2007 for Super Deluxe.

On May 7, 2008, Super Deluxe merged with adultswim.com, moving some series over to the merged site, but most of the content has now become unavailable, including this series. However, the festival version short films can still be seen.

Series storyline
The show follows the exaggerated exploits of 'Simon' and 'Derek', exploring the tragic missteps that the pair encounter as 'outside' forces constantly work against them as they wander through Los Angeles, spending most of their time in bars and chasing women.

Supporting Characters and Guest Appearances
Derek Waters and Simon Helberg incorporated guest appearances from many of their comedy friends, including Bob Odenkirk, Richard Dunn, Bill Hader, Sue Foley, Samm Levine, Joseph Nunez, June Diane Raphael, Casey Wilson, Marianna Palka, Busy Philipps, Michael Cera, Zach Galifianakis,  Jake Johnson and Steve Agee.

Awards and nominations
2008, winner, 'Best web video series', Hollywood NetAwards
2007, nominated, 'Best Original Web Comedy Series', TV Guide Online Video Awards

References

External links 
 

American comedy web series